Colomac Airport  was located near Colomac Mine in the Northwest Territories, Canada where caribou may be found on the runway. Prior permission was required to land except in the case of an emergency.

References

External links
Page about this airport on COPA's Places to Fly airport directory

Defunct airports in the Northwest Territories